Mata-e-Jaan Hai Tu is a social romantic novel written by a female Pakistani author Farhat Ishtiaq. It is an Urdu language novel about the love story of a young couple.

Plot 
A young couple falls in love with each other. They are studying at Columbia University, USA. They marry against the wishes of the boy's father, who cuts them off from his family. A sudden twist of fate brings the girl face to face with the boy's parents and she tries her best to win their hearts.she is very wise and intelligent so she won the heart of boy's parents

Adaptation 

The novel was adapted into a television series by the same name which aired on Hum TV in 2011.

References

External links 
 Mata-e-Jaan Hai Tu at Goodreads
 Mata-e-Jaan Hai Tu at amazone

Pakistani novels
Pakistani romance novels
Urdu-language fiction
Urdu-language novels